Purasawakkam, also known as Purasaiwakkam or Purasai / Purasawalkam, is a residential shopping area in the district of Chennai in the state of Tamil Nadu, India. It is close to the Chennai Central and Chennai Egmore  railway stations.

Etymology
The name "Purasai" came from the name of a tree called 'purasai maram' in Tamil. In olden days this area was abundant with these trees. Also, there were a lot of stables at once in an age which was referred as (horse) "puravi" in Tamil, puravivakkam later termed as purasaiwakkam. The Gangadeeshwarar temple near the Purasawalkam tank speaks about this history. The tank belongs to this temple.

The Gangadeeshwarar temple is very famous temple for ages. Here the Shiva Lingam which is situated at mulasthanam, has a unique feature of wetness throughout the year. Even in the drought conditions and severe summer seasons, the wetness near the Shiva Lingam is observed.

Another story is that, in 1799, Company Assistant Surgeon John Underwood of the British East India Company in the then Madrasapattanam, established in "Poorshewak", now known as Purasawalkam, what may be considered the first hospital in India meant solely for the Indian poor; the Native Infirmary.

Politics
Purasawalkam legislative assembly constituency is a part of Chennai Central (Lok Sabha constituency).

Landmarks
Kellys Signal on the West and Doveton Signal on the East.  Further this area is still known by the prominent theatres like  Motcham, Mekala, Abhirami, Roxy, though all of have been demolished now.

Economy

Abirami Mega Mall, is a Multiplex including four main cinemas and shopping outlets. Tana Street, the heart of Purasawalkam, is one of the busiest streets in Chennai. It has jewelry, vegetables, clay pot cooking and pharmacies. It also features a busy grocery market. There are also many textile showrooms. Dr. Ambedkar Government Law College's boys hostel is also situated here opposite to Motcham theater.

Education

Colleges

 Hindustan Institute of Maritime Training(HIMT)
 Madras Veterinary College
 Madras Theological Seminary &College
 Lutheran Theological College
 Hindustan Bible College
 Chengalvaraya Polytechnic College
 Guru Shanthi Vijay Jain College for Women
 Government College of Fine Arts, Chennai

Schools

Tulsi Adarsh Vidya Mandir Nuesery & Primary School
Satya Matriculation Higher Secondary School
Alagappa Matriculation Higher Secondary School,
Chinmaya Vidyalaya (Taylors Road)
Bhavan's Rajaji Vidyashram,
J.M matriculation school
Sindhi Model Senior Secondary School
St.Joseph's Anglo Indian Boys Higher Secondary School
St. Aloysius Anglo Indian Girls Hr.Sec School
Sir MCTM Boys Hr.Sec. School
Sir MCTM Girls Hr.Sec. School
Kola Saraswathi Senior Secondary School
Bentick Girls Hr.Sec. School
St.Pauls Hr.Sec. School
Guru Shree Shanti Vijai Jain Vidyalaya
St. Matthias Anglo Indian Higher Secondary School,
CSI Bains Hr.Sec. School, 
Doveton Corrie Anglo-Indian Boys Hr.Sec. School
Doveton Corrie Anglo-Indian Girls Hr.Sec. School
Doveton Matric Hr. Sec School
C.S.I Ewarts Girls Hr.Sec. School
Anita Methodist Matriculation Higher Secondary School
St. Andrews Boys Hr.Sec. School
ELM Fabricus Hr.Sec. School
St.Joseph's Girls Hr.Sec School
St.Joseph's Primary School
Raja Nursery School
Corporation Girls School
Corporation Boys School
Sri Muthukuaramswamy Hr.Sec School
T.E.L.C.Primary School
Seventh-Day Adventist Matric. Hr.Sec School (Vepery)

References

Neighbourhoods in Chennai
Cities and towns in Chennai district